The Roman Catholic Diocese of Carora is a diocese located in the city of Carora in the Ecclesiastical province of Barquisimeto in Venezuela. It was established from the Metropolitan Archdiocese of Barquisimeto on July 25, 1992.

Ordinaries
Eduardo Herrera Riera (1994-07-05 – 2003-12-05)
Ulises Antonio Gutiérrez Reyes, O. de M. (2003-12-05 – 2011-08-27)
Luis Armando Tineo Rivera (2013-07-23 – 2020-06-23)
Carlos Enrique Curiel Herrera (2021.03.30 – ...)

See also 
 Roman Catholicism in Venezuela

References

External links
 GCatholic.org
 Catholic Hierarchy 

Roman Catholic dioceses in Venezuela
Roman Catholic Ecclesiastical Province of Barquisimeto
Christian organizations established in 1992
Roman Catholic dioceses and prelatures established in the 20th century
1992 establishments in Venezuela
Carora